{{Infobox person
| name         = Lindsay Wagner
| image        = Lindsay Wagner by Gage Skidmore 2.jpg
| caption      = Wagner in 2019
| birth_date   = 
| birth_place  = Los Angeles, California, U.S.
| education    = University of Oregon (withdrawn)Mt. Hood Community College (withdrawn)
| occupation   = Actress, model, author, singer, acting coach, adjunct professor
| years_active = 1971–present
| known_for    = Jaime Sommers – The Bionic WomanThe Six Million Dollar ManThe Paper ChaseScruples| spouse       = 
| children     = 2
| relatives    = 
}}

Lindsay Jean Wagner (born June 22, 1949) is an American film and television actress, model, author, singer, and acting coach. Wagner is best known for her leading role in the American science-fiction television series The Bionic Woman (1976–1978), in which she portrayed action character Jaime Sommers. She first played this role on the series The Six Million Dollar Man. The character became a popular-culture icon of the 1970s. For this role, Wagner won an Emmy Award for Outstanding Lead Actress in a Dramatic Role in 1977 – the first for an actor or actress in a science fiction series. Wagner began acting professionally in 1971 and has maintained a lengthy acting career in a variety of film and television productions to the present day.

Early life
Wagner was born in Los Angeles, California, the daughter of Marilyn Louise ( Thrasher) and William Nowels Wagner. When she was seven years old, Wagner's parents divorced and her mother moved with her to the northeast Los Angeles neighborhood of Eagle Rock, near Pasadena. Another relocation with her mother and stepfather, Ted Ball, brought Wagner to Portland, Oregon, where she attended David Douglas High School and appeared in a number of school plays.

After graduation, Wagner spent a couple of months in France before enrolling at the University of Oregon for one year. Wagner then transferred to Mt. Hood Community College, Gresham, for six months before dropping out and moving to Los Angeles. She was diagnosed with dyslexia.

Career
Wagner worked as a model in Los Angeles and gained some television experience by appearing as a hostess in Playboy After Dark, and she was also a contestant on the game show The Dating Game in 1969 (one of her potential suitors, whom she did not choose, was TV actor Roger Ewing). In 1971, she signed a contract with Universal Studios and worked as a contract player in Universal productions. Her primetime network television debut was in the series Adam-12 ("Million Dollar Buff"), and she went on to appear in a dozen other Universal shows, including Owen Marshall: Counselor at Law, The F.B.I., Sarge, and Night Gallery (1971, as the nurse in the episode: "The Diary").

Between 1971 and 1975, she appeared in five episodes of Universal's Marcus Welby, M.D. and two episodes of The Rockford Files. In 1973, Wagner branched into film roles when Universal cast her in Two People, which was her first feature film and her first lead role. She also co-starred in the 20th Century Fox film The Paper Chase the same year, playing the daughter of the stern law professor, Kingsfield.

In 1975, arranged under her extended contract with Universal Studios, Wagner played the role of Jaime Sommers, a former tennis professional who was the childhood sweetheart of "Six Million Dollar Man" Colonel Steve Austin (played by Lee Majors). According to Kenneth Johnson, interviewed for a featurette included in the 2010 North American DVD release of The Bionic Woman season one, Wagner was cast in the role based upon her appeal and spontaneity after he saw her appearance in the pilot and a follow-up episode of The Rockford Files. In the third-season, two-part episode, her character is critically injured in a skydiving accident and equipped with bionic implants similar to Austin's, but her body rejects them, ultimately leading to her death.

This was intended to be Wagner's last role under her Universal contract, but public response to the character was so overwhelming that the "death" was retconned into a cover story for a near-death secret recovery, and Wagner appeared in a two-part episode which returned her character, followed by a spin-off series, The Bionic Woman, which debuted in January 1976. The same year, she co-starred in a Canadian film, Second Wind opposite James Naughton. She made several crossover appearances in The Six Million Dollar Man during the series' run. The role earned Wagner an Emmy Award for "Best Actress in a Dramatic Role" in 1977.

Following the cancellation of The Bionic Woman in 1978, Wagner continued to act, predominantly in television miniseries and television films. These included the highly rated 1980 miniseries Scruples, as well as three made-for-TV Bionic reunion movies with Lee Majors between 1987 and 1994. Also in the 1980s, Wagner co-starred as Sylvester Stallone's ex-wife in his 1981 movie Nighthawks and starred in two more weekly television series, Jessie (1984) and A Peaceable Kingdom (1989), though both of these were short-lived. In 1983, she also appeared in an episode of Lee Majors' series The Fall Guy.

Wagner continued to act into the 1990s and 2000s, though in less prominent roles, such as a small part in the action movie Ricochet (1991). Her most recent projects have included the 2005 television film Thicker than Water with Melissa Gilbert, Buckaroo: The Movie (2005), and Four Extraordinary Women (2006). In 2010, Wagner began a recurring role as Dr. Vanessa Calder in the SyFy channel's hit drama Warehouse 13 and played the character again in its Syfy sister show Alphas in 2011. In the fall semester of 2013, Wagner began teaching at San Bernardino Valley College in southern California (Acting and Directing for Television and Film, Motion Picture Production) as an adjunct faculty member. In 2015, Wagner appeared in the NCIS season 13, episode 10: "Blood Brothers" in the role of Barbara Bishop, the mother of NCIS Probationary Agent Eleanor Bishop (Emily Wickersham).

She appeared in Grey's Anatomy as Alex Karev's mother, Helen Karev, over the course of two seasons, first appearing in 2018 during Season 14 for a single episode and reappearing in 2019 for a number of episodes during Season 15.

In June 2018, it was announced that Wagner would co-star in Death Stranding, a video game being developed by Sony Interactive Entertainment and Kojima Productions. Wagner lent her likeness to the characters Bridget and Amelie Strand and voiced the former, with Emily O'Brien voicing the latter and a younger version of the former. Death Stranding was Wagner's first role in a video game, and her first experience with the industry's motion capture and voice acting technology.

Other work

In 1987, Wagner wrote a series of books with Robert M. Klein about using acupressure to achieve results akin to a surgical facelift. In 1994, she wrote one of the first "celebrity" vegetarian (and mainly vegan) cookbooks, High Road to Health. Wagner appeared in commercials as a spokesperson for Southern California's regional Ford Motor Company dealerships from 1987 through 2000. She was also a spokesperson in infomercials for Select Comfort's "Sleep Number" bed from 2003 to 2009.

In recent years, Wagner has given seminars and workshops for her self-help therapy, "Quiet the Mind and Open the Heart," which promotes spirituality and meditation.

In 2010, she participated in interviews and featurettes included in the long-delayed North American DVD releases of The Bionic Woman and the 2011 release of The Six Million Dollar Man.In 2016, Wagner publicly advocated as a treatment for her chronic urticaria (i.e., hives) Miracle Mineral Solution (MMS), a substance which the US Food and Drug Administration (FDA) declared was a toxic industrial bleach used in wastewater treatment and hydraulic fracturing.

Honors
Wagner earned an Emmy Award in 1977 for Outstanding Lead Actress in a Dramatic Role for her role in The Bionic Woman television series.

On December 13, 1984, the Hollywood Chamber of Commerce presented Wagner with a star on the Hollywood Walk of Fame, category 'Film', located at the north side of the 6700 block of Hollywood Boulevard.

In 2012, a Golden Palm Star on the Palm Springs, California, Walk of Stars was dedicated to Wagner.

On October 18, 2019, the San Diego International Film Festival presented the actress with the Humanitarian Award. Previous winners include, Geena Davis, Mariel Hemingway and Joaquin Phoenix.

Personal life
During the first year of The Bionic Woman, Wagner was the driver in a car accident with her then boyfriend, actor Michael Brandon, in the passenger seat. Brandon almost lost an eye and Wagner received a severe cut on her upper lip which left a small but permanent scar. The event halted production on the show for weeks.

Prior to being married, Wagner lived with Captain Daniel M. Yoder (USAF) until he went to Vietnam. She has been married and divorced four times. From 1971 to 1973, she was married to music publisher Allan Rider. From 1976 to 1979, she was married to Michael Brandon. In 1981, she married stuntman Henry Kingi, whom she met on the set of The Bionic Woman. Wagner had two sons with Kingi, Dorian (b. 1982) and Alex (b. 1986). The couple divorced in 1984. Wagner married TV producer Lawrence Mortorff in 1990 and they divorced three years later.

Wagner was scheduled to be a passenger on American Airlines Flight 191 from Chicago to Los Angeles on May 25, 1979, but suddenly felt very ill while waiting for the plane. She skipped the flight, which crashed only minutes after takeoff, killing all 271 people on board and 2 people on the ground – the deadliest aviation accident to have occurred in the United States.

Filmography
Film

Television

Video games

Awards and nominations

Books
1987: Lindsay Wagner's New Beauty: The Acupressure Facelift by Lindsay Wagner and Robert M. Klein
1988: 30-Day Natural Face Lift Program by Lindsay Wagner and Robert M. Klein
1994: High Road to Health: A Vegetarian Cookbook'' by Lindsay Wagner and Ariane Spade

References

External links

 
 
 

 
 

1949 births
Actors with dyslexia
American film actresses
American television actresses
20th-century American actresses
21st-century American actresses
Outstanding Performance by a Lead Actress in a Drama Series Primetime Emmy Award winners
Living people
Actresses from Los Angeles
Actresses from Portland, Oregon
David Douglas High School alumni
Mt. Hood Community College alumni
University of Oregon alumni
Vegetarian cookbook writers